Mineral County is a county located in the U.S. state of Nevada. As of the 2020 census, the population was 4,554, making it the fourth-least populous county in Nevada. Its county seat is Hawthorne.

History
Mineral County was carved out of Esmeralda County in 1911 shortly after the county seat of Esmeralda was moved to Goldfield in 1907. Its name came from the surrounding area, which is heavily mineralized. Hawthorne has always been its county seat. The county is listed as Nevada Historical Marker 16. The marker is located on U.S. Highway 95 at Walker Lake.

Geography
The highest point in Mineral County is Mount Grant at 11,285 ft (3,440 m).

Major highways

  Interstate 11 (Future)
  U.S. Route 6
  U.S. Route 95
  U.S. Route 95 Alternate
  U.S. Route 95 Truck (Hawthorne)
  State Route 359
  State Route 360
  State Route 361

Adjacent counties
 Lyon County - northwest
 Churchill County - north
 Nye County - northeast
 Esmeralda County - southeast
 Mono County, California - southwest

National protected areas
 Inyo National Forest (part)
 Toiyabe National Forest (part)

Demographics

2000 census
At the 2000 census there were 5,071 people, 2,197 households, and 1,379 families living in the county.  The population density was 1 person per square mile (1/km2).  There were 2,866 housing units at an average density of 1 per square mile (0/km2).  The racial makeup of the county was 73.9% White, 4.8% Black or African American, 15.5% Native American, 0.8% Asian, 0.1% Pacific Islander, 2.7% from other races, and 2.4% from two or more races. 8.44% of the population were Hispanic or Latino of any race.
Of the 2,197 households 25.40% had children under the age of 18 living with them, 45.20% were married couples living together, 11.50% had a female householder with no husband present, and 37.20% were non-families. 31.60% of households were one person and 15.10% were one person aged 65 or older.  The average household size was 2.26 and the average family size was 2.78.

The age distribution was 24.40% under the age of 18, 6.20% from 18 to 24, 22.50% from 25 to 44, 27.10% from 45 to 64, and 19.80% 65 or older.  The median age was 43 years. For every 100 females, there were 101.60 males.  For every 100 females age 18 and over, there were 98.30 males.

The median household income was $32,891 and the median family income  was $39,477. Males had a median income of $31,929 versus $25,262 for females. The per capita income for the county was $16,952.  About 11.00% of families and 15.20% of the population were below the poverty line, including 17.70% of those under age 18 and 10.70% of those age 65 or over.

2010 census
At the 2010 census, there were 4,772 people, 2,240 households, and 1,258 families living in the county. The racial makeup of the county was 72.5% white, 15.5% Native American, 4.1% black or African American, 1.1% Asian, 0.1% Pacific islander, 2.1% from other races, and 4.4% from two or more races. Those of Hispanic or Latino origin made up 9.1% of the population. In terms of ancestry, 23.8% were English, 18.5% were German, 13.8% were Irish, 9.3% were Scottish, 5.2% were Portuguese, and 3.7% were American.

Of the 2,240 households, 21.2% had children under the age of 18 living with them, 39.0% were married couples living together, 11.2% had a female householder with no husband present, 43.8% were non-families, and 36.7% of households were made up of individuals. The average household size was 2.11 and the average family size was 2.70. The median age was 49.2 years.

The median household income was $35,446 and the median family income  was $57,064. Males had a median income of $48,281 versus $33,830 for females. The per capita income for the county was $23,226. About 11.4% of families and 19.1% of the population were below the poverty line, including 11.0% of those under age 18 and 12.6% of those age 65 or over.

Communities

There are no incorporated communities in Mineral County.

Census-designated places
 Hawthorne (county seat)
 Mina
 Schurz
 Walker Lake

Unincorporated communities
 Luning

Other places

 Aurora
 Babbitt
 Basalt
 Belleville
 Broken Hills
 Candelaria
 Eagleville
 Kinkaid
 Lucky Boy
 Marietta
 Montgomery Pass
 Omco
 Rand
 Rawhide
 Rhodes
 Sodaville
 Thorne

Politics

See also

 National Register of Historic Places listings in Mineral County, Nevada

References

External links
 
 Mineral County
 Mineral County Chamber of Commerce
 Walker Lake Recreation Area

 
1911 establishments in Nevada
Populated places established in 1911